Kahara is a village and tehsil in Doda district, Jammu, India. It is situated between mountainous cliffs  from Thathri on the  Thathri-Gandoh road.

Geography
kahara is located at 33.093°N 75.870°E
On the right bank of the river kala goni. Kahara is a hilly area in the Doda district, with several villages including Joura Kalan, Joura Khurd, Budhi, Kunthal, Shamdlian, Jia Halaran, Halaran, Kencha, Tanta, Malanoo and Batogra.

Kahara was part of Thathri tehsil as a block. It was separated as a new tehsil in 201 and is now part of the subdivision Thathri. Kahara is on the Thathri-Gandoh road, which links with National Highway 244 at Thathri.

Tehsil kahara is considered as Central place and business hub for the peripheral villages. The tehsil is well connected with the rural village roads important roads are kahara jaie road, kahara Tanta road, kahara kansoo road etc. The main stay of the region is mostly farming as around 90% of the population is rural and directly or indirectly dependent on the agriculture and allied sectors and thus constitutes the main source of livelihood.

Politics
Mehraj Malik is the District Development Council councilor from the Kahara constituency.

References

Villages in Doda district